Dilophiocara is a genus of harvestmen in the family Sclerosomatidae.

Species
 Dilophiocara afghanus (Roewer, 1960)
 Dilophiocara bactrianum Redikorzev, 1931

References

Harvestmen